The Municipal Offices Act 1710 (9 Ann c 19) was an Act of the Parliament of Great Britain.

This Act was partly repealed by section 1 of 3 & 4 Vict c 47.

The whole Act, so far as unrepealed, was repealed by section 307(1)(b) of, and Part IV of Schedule 11 to, the Local Government Act 1933. This repeal did not extend to Scotland, Northern Ireland or London (s. 308(2)).

The whole Act, except so far as it related to the City of London, ceased to have effect by virtue of section 205 of, and schedule 7 to, the London Government Act 1939.

The whole Act, except so far as it related to the City of London, was repealed in its application to the administrative county of London by section 207(1) of, and Schedule 8 to, the London Government Act 1939.

Section 1
This section, from the words "For remedy whereof" down to the end of the section, was repealed by section 3 of, and the Schedule to, the Statute Law Revision and Civil Procedure Act 1883.

Section 2
This section was repealed by section 3 of, and the Schedule to, the Statute Law Revision and Civil Procedure Act 1883.

Section 3
This section was repealed by section 3 of, and the Schedule to, the Statute Law Revision and Civil Procedure Act 1883.

Section 4
This section was repealed by section 84(6) of the Local Government Act 1933. This repeal did not extend to Scotland, Northern Ireland or London (s. 308(2)).

Section 5
This section was repealed by section 84(6) of the Local Government Act 1933. This repeal did not extend to Scotland, Northern Ireland or London (s. 308(2)).

Section 6
This section was repealed by section 3 of, and the Schedule to, the Statute Law Revision and Civil Procedure Act 1883.

Section 7
This section was repealed by section 3 of, and the Schedule to, the Statute Law Revision and Civil Procedure Act 1881.

References
Halsbury's Statutes,

Great Britain Acts of Parliament 1710